Filip Kljajić (born 16 August 1990) is a Serbian football goalkeeper who plays for Novi Pazar. He is the son of Dušan Kljajić.

Club career

Early years
Born in Belgrade, Kljajić spent some period in Red Star Belgrade youth categories. He started his senior career with Hajduk Beograd, making 8 appearances in Serbian First League. He was declared as a man of the match 3 times with average rating 7.31. Next of Hajduk Beograd, he left to Jagnjilo, and joined Šumadija for 2009–10 season. Kljajić played 28 times, with average rating 7.31, and was declared as a man of the match 2 times. He also played for Šumadija in first half of 2010–11 season and made 13 appearances.

Metalac Gornji Milanovac
Kljajić signed with Metalac for second half of season, and mainly was a reserve for Dejan Bogunović. He was licensed with squad number 9, atypically for goalkeepers. He was in first 11 3 times. On the beginning of season, Kljajić changed his jersey number, and took 12. He shared his position with Živko Živković, but he was selected as a first choice in front of goal 17 times. He was also declared as the best on the field 3 times.

Rad
After Metalac's relegation from SuperLiga, Kljajić joined Rad. Coach Nikolić included him in first 11 24 times in front of his competitors Branislav Danilović, Aleksandar Jovanović and Boris Radunović. On 10 November 2013, Kljajić saved penalty kick from Dragan Mrđa. For the first half of 2013–14 season Kljajić made 14 appearances, and was declared as a man of the match 1 time. After 2014, he received the contract termination on the detriment of the club.

Partizan
On 14 February 2014, Kljajić came to Partizan and signed a four-year contract with Partizan and took the number 12 on shirt. After signing for Partizan, Kljajić was sent on loan to Teleoptik. He collected 12 games in second half of 2013–14.

Kljajić returned to Partizan at the beginning of new season, as a competitor of Milan Lukač and Živko Živković, his former Metalac teammate. Coach Marko Nikolić, who also trained Kljajić in Rad included him in first 11 in Serbian Cup against Sloga Petrovac. He was in protocol several times, but made no league debut. He has also been on the bench four times, in UEFA Europa League, two times against Beşiktaş, one time against Tottenham Hotspur and Asteras Tripolis. During the season, he was not given a chance beside Milan Lukač and Živko Živković, mainly defended in friendly matches and several times was on the bench. On 1 November 2015, Kljajić made his debut for Partizan in SuperLiga against his former club, Metalac in a 1–0 away defeat. Four days later, he made his debut for the club in Europa League group stage against Athletic Bilbao at San Mamés. Two weeks later, Kljajić made his second cap in Europa League in a 1–2 away victory over AZ. In 2015–16 season Kljajić made 13 appearances in all competitions.

After he succeeded Bojan Šaranov, Kljajić played mostly matches in the 2016–17 season as a first choice goalkeeper. At the beginning of May 2017, Kljajić earned a hand injury and missed the rest of a season. In summer 2017, Kljajić extended his contract with Partizan until 2021. He also started the next season  as a first choice, but after the club signed Vladimir Stojković, Kljajić spent the rest of the same year as a back-up pick.

On 30 December 2017, Kljajić moved on six-month loan deal to Platanias, without an option to purchase the contract.

International career
Kljajić made his international debut for the Serbia national football team in a friendly 3-0 loss to Qatar, played on 29 September 2016, under coach Slavoljub Muslin.

Career statistics

Club

International

Honours
Partizan
Serbian SuperLiga: 2014–15, 2016–17
Serbian Cup: 2015–16, 2016–17

References

External links
 Filip Kljajić stats at utakmica.rs 
 
 
 
 

Association football goalkeepers
Footballers from Belgrade
FK Hajduk Beograd players
FK Metalac Gornji Milanovac players
FK Rad players
FK Partizan players
FK Teleoptik players
Serbian First League players
Serbian SuperLiga players
Serbian footballers
Serbian expatriate footballers
Serbian expatriate sportspeople in Greece
Expatriate footballers in Greece
Platanias F.C. players
J2 League players
Omiya Ardija players
1990 births
Living people
Serbia international footballers